This article lists fellows of the Royal Society who were elected on 29 April 2016.

Fellows of the Royal Society (FRS)

 Chris Abell
 Jas Pal Badyal
 Steven Balbus
 Polina Bayvel
 Graham Bell
 Martin Bridson
 John P. Burrows
 Katharine Cashman
 Sarah Cleaveland
 James Collier
 Alastair Compston
 Brian Cox
 Jack Cuzick
 William I. F. David
 Christl Donnelly
 Marcus du Sautoy
 James S. Dunlop
 Artur Ekert
 Maria Fitzgerald
 Antony Galione
 Pratibha Gai
 Harry J. Gilbert
 Patrick Gill
 Anne Glover
 Neil A. R. Gow
 Ian A. Graham
 Richard P. Harvey
 Adrian Hayday
 Ramanujan Hegde
 David Hight
 Sue Ion
 Eugenia Kumacheva
 Corinne Le Quéré
 Mark A. Lemmon
 David Lodge
 Eleanor Maguire
 Lakshminarayanan Mahadevan
 Gilean McVean
 Russell E. Morris
 Luke O'Neill
 Simon Peyton Jones
 Jonathon Pines
 James I. Prosser
 Sriram Ramaswamy
 Caroline Series
 Ted Shepherd
 Alison Mary Smith
 David J. Wales
 Philip J. Withers
 Paul Workman

Honorary fellows
 Adair Turner, Baron Turner of Ecchinswell

Foreign members

 Robert Cava
 Vint Cerf
 Mark M. Davis
 Jennifer Doudna
 Gerd Faltings
 John M. Hayes
 Svante Pääbo
 Pasko Rakic
 Rino Rappuoli
 Ellen D. Williams

Gallery

References
    

2016
2016 in the United Kingdom
2016 in science